Following are the results of the 1949 Soviet Top League football championship.

Standings

Results

Top scorers
26 goals
 Nikita Simonyan (Spartak Moscow)

23 goals
 Ivan Konov (Dynamo Moscow)
 Aleksandr Ponomarev (Torpedo Moscow)

20 goals
 Konstantin Beskov (Dynamo Moscow)

19 goals
 Andrei Zazroyev (Dinamo Tbilisi)

18 goals
 Grigory Fedotov (CDKA Moscow)

17 goals
 Vladimir Savdunin (Dynamo Moscow)

16 goals
 Viktor Terentyev (Spartak Moscow)

15 goals
 Aleksei Grinin (CDKA Moscow)
 Vasili Lotkov (Dynamo Leningrad)
 Aleksei Paramonov (Spartak Moscow)

References

 Soviet Union - List of final tables (RSSSF)

1949
1
Soviet
Soviet